Foro Italico is a sports complex in Rome, Italy, on the slopes of Monte Mario. It was built between 1928 and 1938 as the Foro Mussolini (literally Mussolini's Forum) under the design of Enrico Del Debbio and, later, Luigi Moretti.  Inspired by the Roman forums of the imperial age, its design is lauded as a preeminent example of Italian fascist architecture instituted by Mussolini. The purpose of the prestigious project was to get the Olympic Games of 1940 to be organised by fascist Italy and held in Rome.

History 

The first buildings of the architectural complex were inaugurated on November 4, 1932: they were Palazzo H, the seat of the Fascist School of Physical Education; the so-called "Monolith"; the Stadio dei Marmi; the Stadio dei Cipressi (then Stadio dei Centomila and now Stadio Olimpico).

In 1936 and, subsequently, until 1941, Luigi Moretti - former author of the Accademia di scherma al Foro Italico in the Foro Mussolini - worked out designs that, while incorporating Del Debbio's urban plan, involved an expansion of the Foro towards Tor di Quinto; these designs were never put into practice.

Description

The main entrance of the Foro is south-east, in line with the ponte Duca d'Aosta: here - on a wide avenue entirely covered with a mosaic made of black and white tesserae - rises a huge obelisk 17,5 meters high (excluding the base), carved in Carrara marble, known as Stele Mussolini.

The facility is decorated with statues, donated by the different Italian Provinces and therefore of different authors, which represent various sport activities: for example, the statue dedicated to javelin throw was donated by the Province of Perugia, while the one representing the so-called "ball with the bracelet" (an ancient Renaissance game) is due to the Province of Forlì-Cesena.

Near the Stadio Olimpico rises the Palazzo della Farnesina, the seat of the Ministry of Foreign Affairs since 1959, designed by the architects who won the architectural design competition: Enrico Del Debbio, Arnaldo Foschini, Vittorio Ballio Morpurgo.

The Foro is home to numerous sports venues, such as the largest sports facility in Rome, the Stadio Olimpico, the ornate Stadio dei Marmi and the adjoining building which is the seat of the Italian National Olympic Committee (originally built for the purposes of the Fascist Male Academy of Physical Education). Foro Italico also comprises an aquatics center built for the 1960 summer Olympics, the Stadio del Nuoto ("Swimming Stadium") and a tennis center.

The tennis center is an extensive area with a total of eleven clay surface tennis courts, eight of which are used for tournaments and the rest for training purposes. There are currently three show or stadium courts: the main one formerly had a capacity of 8,000 spectators; however, a new center court, the Campo Centrale, which can seat up to 10,400 spectators, was constructed for the 2010 tournament. The other show courts are the Supertennis Arena  and Stadio Pietrangeli (formerly Pallacorda, 3,500 seats).

Foro Italico has hosted important events, most notably the 1960 Summer Olympics. The tennis center annually hosts the Italian Open (aka Rome Masters), an ATP World Tour Masters 1000 and WTA Premier event. Since 2012, the Stadio Olimpico hosts the home games of the Italy national rugby union team at the Guinness Six Nations. Other live events like music concerts are also held at the various venues in the complex.

Sports venues 

 Stadio Olimpico
 Stadio dei Marmi
 Stadio del tennis di Roma
 Stadio Olimpico del Nuoto

International sporting events 
 1960, Summer Olympics
 1968, UEFA European Football Championship
 1974, European Athletics Championships
 1980, UEFA European Football Championship
 1983, LEN European Aquatics Championships
 1987, World Championships in Athletics
 1990, FIFA World Cup
 1994, World Aquatics Championships
 2009, World Aquatics Championships
 2011, Beach Volleyball World Championships
 2021, Street Skateboarding World Championships
 2021, UEFA European Football Championship
 2022, LEN European Aquatics Championships
 2024, European Athletics Championships

Walk of fame 

On May 7, 2015 a walk called "The legends of Italian Sport - Walk of fame" has been inaugurated on Viale delle Olimpiadi. On this walk, 100 plaques were set bearing the names of former athletes who wrote the history of national sport chosen by the CONI Athletes Commission.
Many personalities of Italian sport attended at the ceremony, chaired by the President of CONI, Giovanni Malagò. The President announced that in the following years the plates of other former Italian athletes of international importance would be added to the walk.

See also
 List of tennis stadiums by capacity
 Fascist Male Academy of Physical Education
 Opera Nazionale Balilla (ONB)
 Gioventù Italiana del Littorio (GIL)
 Accademia fascista maschile di educazione fisica
 Foro Italico University of Rome
 Italian National Olympic Committee (CONI)

References

Bibliography 
 Marcello Piacentini, Il Foro Mussolini in Roma. Arch. Enrico Del Debbio, in "Architettura", February 1933, file II, pp. 65–75
 Mario Paniconi, Criteri informatori e dati sul Foro Mussolini, in "Architettura", February 1933, file II, pp. 76–89
 Organizzazioni e caratteristiche tecniche dell'opera, in "Architettura", February 1933, file II, pp. 90–105

External links

Italian fascist architecture
Sports venues in Rome
Tennis venues in Italy
Water polo venues
Rome Q. XV Della Vittoria
Olympic Parks
Outdoor arenas